Cathal Parlon plays his Senior Club Hurling with Coolderry in Offaly.

He attended Waterford Institute of Technology from 2004 to 2007, graduating with a B.Sc. in architectural technology. In 2011 he won Leinster Club Hurler of the Year when Coolderry reached the Club All-Ireland final.

References 

Living people
Offaly inter-county hurlers
Coolderry hurlers
1991 births